Deadly Pursuit may refer to:

Deadly Pursuit (1988 film), a 1988 film also known as Shoot to Kill
Deadly Pursuit (2008 film), a 2008 film

See also
Deadly Pursuits, a 1996 TV movie starring Tori Spelling